Isidro Sánchez Macip  (born June 5, 1987) is a professional soccer coach and former player who played as a midfielder. He is currently the head coach for Las Vegas Lights in the USL Championship. Born in Mexico, he represented the Canada national under-23 team.

Career 
Isidro Sánchez Macip (Puebla, Mexico, June 5 of 1987) is a former soccer player and Mexican coach with Canadian nationality who played as a midfielder for Puebla F.C. and Canada's minor teams.
He acquired Canadian nationality in 2007, to participate with the pre-Olympic team of that country, in the CONCACAF qualifying tournament, prior to the Beijing Olympic Games. After his career as a soccer player, he began to prepare to be a coach. Currently the Mexican-Canadian has 4 professional coaching certificates (RFEF Spain, ENDIT Mexico, CONMEBOL PRO, Pro License USA Soccer), as well as a master's degree in sports psychology. His first experience was in 2013, when he obtained a position as an assistant coach with the Chivas USA (MLS). Isidro made his debut as head coach in 2015 at Real Cuautitlán where he managed to get the team out of the relegation zone.

Sánchez returned to Las Vegas in January 2023 as head coach for the Las Vegas Lights.

Clubs

As a player

As a coach

Studies

References

External links 
 (archive)

1987 births
Living people
Footballers from Puebla
Canadian soccer players
Canada men's under-23 international soccer players
Mexican emigrants to Canada
Canadian people of Mexican descent
Naturalized citizens of Canada
Canadian expatriate soccer players
Expatriate footballers in Mexico
Liga MX players
Club Puebla players
Association football midfielders
Las Vegas Lights FC coaches
USL Championship coaches
Mexican footballers